Protolabis is an extinct genus of camelid endemic to North America. Fossil distribution is widespread from Nicaragua, Central America to Montana and throughout the western U.S.

References

Prehistoric camelids
Miocene even-toed ungulates
Prehistoric even-toed ungulate genera
Aquitanian genus first appearances
Tortonian extinctions
Miocene mammals of North America
Arikareean
Hemingfordian
Barstovian
Clarendonian
Hemphillian
Fossil taxa described in 1876
Taxa named by Edward Drinker Cope